The word Persianism is used to describe any process of forming or transforming a phenomenon into something which has Persian (Iranian) traits and peculiarities.

Persianism can also mean a school of thought which emphasises the study of Persian culture and informing others about it. It is said by the scholar Ofira Seliktar that Shi'ism and Persianism overlap in Iran.

The scholar Muhammad Iqbal wrote, "The conquest of Persia meant not the conversion of Persia to Islam, but the conversion of Islam to Persianism!"

Speaking of how the Persians regained governance of their country, the scholar Philip Khuri Hitti writes, "Arabianism fell, but Islam under a new guise, that of Persianism, marched on triumphantly."

In the field of linguistics, Persianism is the Persian pronunciation of a word.

References

Social theories